John Fields (born September 11, 1968) is an American record producer, recording engineer, mixer, and musician. Fields has produced for a number of musical artists, including the Jonas Brothers, Switchfoot, Pink, Har Mar Superstar, Miley Cyrus, Ben Rector, Andrew W.K., Busted and Demi Lovato. He also has played a number of musical instruments on various albums, and even occasionally performed live with bands such as Nick Jonas & the Administration, Soul Asylum, and The Rembrandts. He is a founding member of the Minneapolis Funk Collective, Greazy Meal.

Selected production/mix discography
Albums

1992 – Leatherwoods -Topeka Oratorio
1993 – The Commodores – No Tricks
1993 – The Hang Ups - Coming Through
1994 – Delilahs – Delilahs
1994 – David Wolfenson - Abbott Ave
1994 – Mango Jam - Somewhere in the Middle
1994 –	Bug! - Bug!
1995 – The Rembrandts – LP
1995 – The Honeydogs - The Honeydogs
1995 – Marlee MacLeod - Favorite Ball and Chain
1995 – Delilahs – Dying To Build A Bridge
1995 – Iya - Send the Love	
1995 – The Suburbs - Viva! Suburbs! Live at First Avenue
1996 – Willie Wisely - She
1996 – Rex Daisy - Guys and Dolls
1996 – Mango Jam - Flux
1996 – Slim Dunlap	- Times Like This
1996 – Minneapolis Does Denver: Tribute to John Denver
1996 – Greazy Meal - Visualize World Greaze
1996 – Jack Logan - Mood Elevator
1997 – Willie Wisely - Turbosherbet
1997 – Greazy Meal – Digitalize World Greaze
1997 – Marlee MacLeod - Vertigo
1998 – Dovetail Joint - Level EP
1998 – Tina & the B-Sides - It's All Just The Same
1998 – Dovetail Joint - 001
1998 – Greazy Meal – Gravy
1998 – Funkytown (Motion Picture Soundtrack)
2000 – Evan & Jaron – Evan & Jaron
2000 – The Januaries - The Januaries	
2000 – Marlee MacLeod - There We Are
2000 – The Honeydogs - Here's Luck
2001 – Iffy - Biota Bondo
2001 – Andrew W.K. – I Get Wet
2001 – Semisonic – All About Chemistry
2002 – Marlee MacLeod - Like Hollywood
2002 – Bleu - Redhead
2003 – Wheat - Per Second, Per Second, Per Second... Every Second
2003 – Switchfoot – The Beautiful Letdown
2003 – Lillix – Falling Uphill
2003 – Delta Goodrem – Innocent Eyes
2003 – Mandy Moore – Coverage
2003 – Puffy AmiYumi - Nice	
2003 – Pink – Try This
2003 – Andrew W.K. –  - The Wolf
2004 – Har Mar Superstar - The Handler
2004 – Delta Goodrem – Mistaken Identity
2004 – Truman - Payne Avenue
2004 – Greazy Meal – Universe's Baby
2004 – The Dollyrots – Eat My Heart Out
2005 – Glen Phillips – Winter Pays for Summer
2005 – Wakefield - Which Side Are You On?
2005 – Brandi Carlile - Brandi Carlile
2005 – Dropping Daylight - Take A Photograph
2005 – Switchfoot – Nothing Is Sound
2005 – Backstreet Boys – Never Gone
2006 – Switchfoot – Oh! Gravity.
2006 – Clay Aiken - A Thousand Different Ways
2006 – Soul Asylum - The Silver Lining
2006 – Clay Aiken - All Is Well: Songs For Christmas
2007 – Jonas Brothers – Jonas Brothers
2007 – Lifehouse – Who We Are
2007 – The Dollyrots – Because I'm Awesome
2007 – Rooney – Calling the World
2007 – Jimmy Eat World – Chase This Light
2008 – Cut Copy – In Ghost Colours
2008 – The Presets - Apocalypso
2008 – Jonas Brothers – A Little Bit Longer
2008 – Miley Cyrus – Breakout
2008 – Demi Lovato – Don't Forget
2008 – Jon McLaughlin – OK Now
2008 – The Melismatics – The Acid Test
2009 – The Binges – S/T
2009 – Jonas Brothers – Lines, Vines and Trying Times
2009 – Selena Gomez & the Scene – Kiss & Tell
2009 – Miley Cyrus – The Time of Our Lives
2009 – Evan Taubenfeld – Welcome to the Blacklist Club
2009 – Bleu - A Watched Pot 
2009 – Ballas Hough Band - BHB
2009 – Demi Lovato – Here We Go Again
2009 – Parachute – Losing Sleep
2009 – Honor Society - Fashionably Late
2010 – Jonas Brothers – Jonas L.A.
2010 – Nick Jonas & the Administration – Who I Am
2010 – Goo Goo Dolls – Something for the Rest of Us
2010 – Steven Page – Page One
2010 – Alex Max Band - We've All Been There
2011 – The Summer Set – Everything's Fine
2011 – Daryl Hall – Laughing Down Crying
2011 – Allstar Weekend – All the Way
2011 – Parachute – The Way It Was
2011 – All Time Low – Dirty Work
2011 – Drake Bell – A Reminder
2011 – Jon Stevens – Testify!
2012 – The Dollyrots – The Dollyrots
2012 – Sam Sparro – Return to Paradise
2012 – Dave Barnes – Stories To Tell
2012 – Peter Cincotti – Metropolis
2012 – Windsor Drive – Wanderlust
2013 – Sunderland – Closer Now
2013 – Lily Kershaw - Midnight In The Garden
2013 – Jon Stevens - Fly (from the movie "Planes")
2013 – The Dead Daisies - The Dead Daisies
2013 – Marc Martel – The Prelude EP
2013 – Tyler Ward - Honestly
2013 – Megan and Liz – In the Shadows Tonight
2014 – Tenth Avenue North - Cathedrals
2014 – The Dollyrots – Barefoot and Pregnant
2014 – American Hi-Fi – Blood and Lemonade
2014 – Hurrah A Bolt of Light – Hurrah A Bolt of Light
2014 – Anastacia – Resurrection
2014 – Martel – Impersonator
2015 – Lawson - Perspective
2016 – Soul Asylum - Change of Fortune
2016 – Switchfoot – Where the Light Shines Through
2016 – The Dollyrots - Mama's Gonna Knock You Out EP
2016 – Busted – Night Driver
2016 – The Honeydogs - Love & Cannibalism
2017 – Flor - Come Out. You're Hiding
2017 – Anastacia – Evolution
2017 – The Dollyrots - Whiplash Splash
2017 – Friday Pilots Club - End Of It
2018 – Ben Rector - Magic
2019 – Tiny Moving Parts - Breathe
2019 – Ben Rector - MPLS Magic EP
2019 – The Dollyrots - Daydream Explosion
2019 – Cory Wong - Motivational Music for the Syncopated Soul
2019 – Flor - ley lines
2020 – Soul Asylum - Hurry Up And Wait
2020 – Irontom - Cult Following
2020 – Matt Wilson & his Orchestra - When I Was a Writer
2020 – Scott Mulvahill - Creative Potential EP
2020 – Jonatha Brooke - The Sweetwater Sessions
2020 – Vanessa Amorosi - The Blacklisted Collection
2020 – Public – Honey In The Summer (single)
2020 – Katy for Kings - Novelty EP
2020 – Zach Heckendorf - Hawk Talk 
2020 – James Bourne - Safe Journey Home
2020 – Soul Asylum - Born Free
2020 – Ben Rector - It Would Be You (single)
2021 – Cory Wong - Cory and The Wongnotes Variety Show - Season 1
2021 – Cody Fry - Pictures of Mountains
2021 – Jetty Bones - Push Back
2021 – The Shackletons - The Shackletons
2022 – Cory Wong - Cory and The Wongnotes Variety Show - Season 2
2022 – Flipp - Too Dumb To Quit
2022 – Katy For Kings - Kinda, Almost EP
2022 – Sons Of Silver - Ordinary Sex Appeal EP
2022 – Ben Rector - The Joy Of Music
2022 – Ben Rector & Thomas Rhett - "What Makes a Man"

References

External links 
 McDonough Management LLC
 

1968 births
American pop rock musicians
American record producers
Living people
Musicians from Boston
Nick Jonas & the Administration members